Green Schools Alliance (GSA) is an effort by primary and secondary schools worldwide to address climate change and conservation challenges by creating a peer-to-peer network of school members committed to reducing their greenhouse gas emissions and accelerating the implementation of sustainable solutions.

GSA-member schools share and implement sustainability best practices and promote connections between schools, communities, and the environments that sustain them. GSA does this by creating peer-to-peer forums, exchanging resources, offering original programs and curriculum, and connecting youth to nature. The sustainability coordinators that participate in the network are composed of faculty, staff, students, administrators, and other school decision makers.

History
The GSA was formed in October 2007 as a result of Mayor of New York City Michael Bloomberg’s PlaNYC and related challenge to all NYC facilities to reduce carbon emissions by 30% by 2050, with support from the NYC Mayor's Office of Long-Term Planning and Sustainability, New York State Energy Research and Development Authority (NYSERDA), Clinton Climate Initiative (CCI), Consolidated Edison, National Association of Independent Schools (NAIS) and National Business Officers Association (NBOA).

The Allen-Stevenson School in NYC hosted the first GSA planning session that convened schools to address climate change and "what schools can do about it", and review the GSA Commitment. With additional guidance from the American College & University Presidents' Climate Commitment (ACUPCC), Second Nature and AASHE, the GSA primary and secondary school climate commitment was further refined. In November 2007, with a signatory group of 40 schools, the GSA was launched to the public at the US Green Building Council annual GreenBuild Conference when President Bill Clinton highlighted the GSA in his keynote speech. It is currently listed as one of the organizations committed to the Climate Education and Literacy Initiative launched by the White House Office of Science and Technology Policy (OSTP)

Green Schools Alliance today
The 501c3 nonprofit organization connects more than 9,000 schools, districts, and organizations worldwide, representing more than 5 million students in 48 U.S. states, the District of Columbia, and 88 countries. Schools participate individually or and as entire school districts to share sustainability best practices and reduce their environmental footprint. In January 2016, 21 school districts formed the Green Schools Alliance District Collaborative to harness the collective power of schools to support greener, more efficient solutions. These districts build and share best practices, leverage their combined purchasing power to increase access to sustainable alternatives, promote market transformation, and influence policy decisions. Charter members of the District Collaborative affect the lives of 3.6 million children in 5,726 schools with more than 550 million square feet of building area.

Membership to the GSA's online community is free. Schools and districts can also pledge the Sustainability Leadership, where principals, heads of school, and superintendents pledge to take action in these areas: Reduce Our Climate & Ecological Impact,  Educate & Engage Our Community, and Transform Our Culture.

Programs
GSA programs integrate education and action and aggregate and quantify progress. Using the building and campus as a teaching tool, students work alongside faculty and staff on projects from recycling, weatherizing, conducting energy audits, changing lights and replacing old boilers to improving science and technology education, restoring wetlands and planting green roofs. Best practices ripple outward from schools to families, to the workplace. GSA programs include:
 Green Cup Challenge 
 Student Climate & Conservation Corps (Sc3) 
 GSA Online Community
 GSA Sustainability Leadership Commitment
 GSA Purchasing Solution 
 OnAir Schools
 protostar
 Sustainability Tracking and Roadmap Tool (START)

See also
 Environmental groups and resources serving K–12 schools

References

External links
 Green Schools Alliance

Environmental education in the United States
Non-profit organizations based in New York City
Environmental organizations based in New York (state)
Educational organizations based in the United States
Schools programs
Youth empowerment organizations
Children's charities based in the United States
Environmental organizations based in New York City